Eric John Godley (10 May 1919 – 27 June 2010) OBE, FRSNZ, Hon FLS, Hon DSc (Cantuar.), AHRNZIH was a New Zealand botanist and academic biographer. He is best known for his long-running series of in the popular magazine New Zealand Gardener and his "Biographical notes" series that ran in the New Zealand Botanical Society Newsletter and which is the prime resource on the lives of many New Zealand botanists.

Born in the Auckland suburb of Devonport to parents Rupert and Louise E. Godley, Godley grew up in Auckland and did his BSc at MSc at Auckland University College, followed by service in World War II and a PhD at Cambridge in cytology and genetics under Ronald Fisher. He returned to lecture at Auckland before moving to the Department of Scientific and Industrial Research at Lincoln, rising to Director of the Botany Division 1958–1981. His work included three trips to the New Zealand subantarctic islands on three occasions, including the Antipodes Islands, the Auckland Islands and Campbell Island. These islands and the geographically separated flora and fauna are botanically important as studies in dispersion and evolution of plants and animals.

Awards and honours 
 1974 – Leonard Cockayne Memorial Lecture of the Royal Society of New Zealand
 1986 – Hutton Medal of the Royal Society of New Zealand
 1990 – OBE For services to botany

References

Further reading

 Peter J. de Lange (2010) Obituary: Dr Eric Godley OBE FRSNZ

1919 births
2010 deaths
20th-century New Zealand botanists
New Zealand Officers of the Order of the British Empire
New Zealand military personnel of World War II
New Zealand biographers
Male biographers
University of Auckland alumni
Alumni of the University of Cambridge
Academic staff of the University of Auckland
People associated with Department of Scientific and Industrial Research (New Zealand)
Fellows of the Royal Society of New Zealand